Balitaang Tapat (The Loyal News) is now defunct afternoon newscast of TV5 produced by News5. The show was aired from November 1, 2010, to May 11, 2012, and was replaced by Aksyon sa Tanghali. The newscast is anchored by Raffy Tulfo and Amelyn Veloso. It is aired on every Monday to Friday at exactly 1:30 PM to 2:00 PM (PST).

Background
The newscast is known for its Itimbre Mo Kay Tulfo segment, where anchor Raffy Tulfo tries to solve community or government problems and other complains that are sent to them either via email or text messaging. In addition, Atty. Mel Sta. Maria (a legal counsel for Associated Broadcasting Company) was the segment host for Sabi ni Attorney, may K ka. However, unlike all other newscasts of News 5, Balitaang Tapat focuses on crime and police reports (especially in Metro Manila), and national news stories come last.

Balitaang Tapat stopped their simulcast over AksyonTV and Radyo5 and ceased airing altogether on May 11, 2012. two years later, News5 returned to noontime newscasting with Aksyon sa Tanghali, with former Balitaang Tapat anchor Raffy Tulfo and former Aksyon JournalisMO and Pilipinas News anchor Cherie Mercado.

Anchors
 Raffy Tulfo
 Amelyn Veloso

Segment Host
 Atty. Mel Sta. Maria (Sabi ni Attorney, may K ka! segment host)
 Pat Fernandez (Aksyon Weather anchor)
 Claudine Trillo (Aksyon Weather anchor)
 Lia Cruz (Short Time segment anchor)
 Roda Magnaye (Bargain Hunter and Chow Time segment anchor)
 Ferdinand "Makata Tawanan" Clemente (Makatang Gala segment anchor)

See also
List of programs aired by TV5 (Philippine TV network)
List of programs aired by AksyonTV/5 Plus

TV5 (Philippine TV network) news shows
TV5 (Philippine TV network) original programming
Philippine television news shows
2010 Philippine television series debuts
2012 Philippine television series endings
Filipino-language television shows